The Central Business District or downtown is located in the heart of Prince Albert's downtown core.  It is the dominant hub for retail, financial, personal and professional services in the city.  Only regional shopping centres are permitted in the area.  Many national businesses were housed in the area, but most have moved to other parts of the city.

It is located from 2nd Ave West - Central Avenue and extends between 2nd and 3rd Avenue East.  It also goes from 15th Street and goes to River Street.  The Central Business District is situated in Midtown.  Plus it is home to many local businesses, civil, provincial, and federal government services.

In the downtown of Prince Albert, many buildings are of architectural and historic value and interest still remain.  Urban city planners as well as landscape architects have a concept of growth and development for the Prince Albert downtown area which was to come to fruition in 2020.

Demographics
There are many seniors' high-rise complexes in the area.  Some are near the area's many amenities.

Commercial and industrial
This area of Prince Albert has very light industrial and much commercial zoning.  The downtown core has residential, many locally owned shops and a variety of services.

Shopping malls
The existing retail areas are being enriched and expanded to provide new investment opportunities and incentive programs for the city.

The Gateway Mall, or North Gate Mall as some refer to it, is the main mall in the area.  It houses over 50 shops and businesses.  This includes both major chains and local businesses.

MacIntosh Mall houses many government services and local businesses.

Government and politics
In municipal politics, the Central Business District lies within ward 2.  Terra Lennox-Zepp is the councillor for the ward.

Provincially, the Central Business District lies within the Prince Albert Carlton riding.  Joe Hargrave is the MLA for the riding.  He has been MLA since 2016.

Federally, the Central Business District exists within the federal electoral district of Prince Albert.  Randy Hoback is the current MP of this riding in which he has been serving since 2008.

Education

First Nations University of Canada - 1401 Central Avenue
SIIT (Saskatchewan Indian Institute of Technology) Prince Albert Campus - 900 - 1st Ave. East
SUNTEP (Saskatchewan Urban Native Teacher Education Program) - 48-12th Street East
University of Saskatchewan - Prince Albert campus - Central Ave.

Recreation

E.A. Rawlinson Centre for the Arts
The E.A. Rawlinson Centre for the Arts houses both the John & Olive Diefenbaker Theatre as well as the Mann Art Gallery.  Located in the heart of downtown the center focuses on highlighting professional visual and performing artists through exhibitions, concerts, musicals, plays, conventions, and fundraising events to Prince Albert and surrounding area.

Events and attractions
The Prince Albert Central Business District hosts several events such as

Christmas shopping
Downtown Old Fashioned Christmas
The Downtown Street Fair
Historical Walking Tour
Santa Clause Parade

Past Events

Founders Day

Galleries

The Mann Art Gallery (formerly the Art Gallery of Prince Albert) is in the E.A. Rawlinson Centre for the Arts. Overlooking the North Saskatchewan River, the Mann Art Gallery is Prince Albert's premier destination for contemporary and historical art, with exhibitions changing bi-monthly. Housing one of the largest permanent collections in the province, the MAG provides regular curated exhibitions from artists influential in developing arts and culture in the region.  It is located at 142 - 12th St. West.

The John V. Hicks Gallery is located on the second floor of the Prince Albert Arts Centre.  It showcases many local artists throughout the year.

On the Avenue Artisan Gallery- located on Central Ave. featuring local artisans.

The Grace Campbell Art Gallery is located in the John M. Cuelenaere Public Library.  The gallery has monthly exhibitions featuring local artists and touring exhibitions.

The Red Door Gallery is located in the Bison Cafe on Central Avenue.

Features
Memorial Square
Prince Albert City Hall
Saskatchewan Forest Centre is located in the downtown core.  Prince Albert, the gateway to the north is also renowned for its location on the tree line of Saskatchewan where prairie meets pine.  At the crux of the North Saskatchewan River Valley and Pehonan Parkway, northern Saskatchewan has enjoyed economic success with its forestry industry.

Heritage Buildings
These heritage sites help to build and maintain a positive identity and historical tourist infrastructure for the Prince Albert business district.

Blockhouse from the 1885 Rebellion - Located in Kinsmen Park.
Former Prince Albert City Hall and Opera House was originally built in 1892 when Saskatchewan was known as the NWT.  It has been officially proclaimed a municipal heritage property as well as being recognized as one of the National historic sites of Canada.  There are not many 19th-century town halls which are still standing today.  Currently it is known as the Prince Albert Arts Centre which is located at 1010 Central Avenue.
The Central Fire Hall which was originally established in 1911, now houses The  Prince  Albert  Historical  Museum.  This turn of the century fire hall has been designated as Municipal Heritage Site on Central Avenue.
The Provincial Courthouse of Prince Albert on Central Avenue has also Municipal Heritage Site status.
The Cathedral Church of St. Alban the Martyr.  Significant churches downtown include St. Alban's Anglican Cathedral, St. Paul's Presbyterian Church and Wesley United Church.
Keyhole Castle
First Presbyterian Church/School - The church is located in the downtown core and the school is located in Kinsmen Park.

Hotels/Motels
Cumberland Crossing Inn - Located at 67 13th Street East
The National Hotel - Located at 906 1st Avenue West.

See also
 Central business district

References

External links
Downtown Prince Albert
The Mann Art Gallery
City of Prince Albert website
paNOW, online community news and information
St. Paul's Presbyterian Church 
ViritualPrinceAlbert.com

Prince Albert
Neighbourhoods in Prince Albert, Saskatchewan